The 1992 Swedish Golf Tour, known as the Lancôme Tour for sponsorship reasons, was the seventh season of the Swedish Golf Tour, a series of professional golf tournaments for women held in Sweden.

1992 was the second year with Lancôme as the main sponsor, and the tour remained the only regional ladies golf tour in Europe operating as a feeder tour for the LET. For the first time no events were scheduled opposite LET events. The number of events were limited and prize money somewhat decreased due to the Early 1990s recession.

Carin Hjalmarsson won three tournaments and her first of two consecutive Order of Merit.

Schedule
The season consisted of 7 tournaments played between May and August, where one event was included on the 1992 Ladies European Tour.

Order of Merit

Source:

See also
1992 Swedish Golf Tour (men's tour)

References

External links
Official homepage of the Swedish Golf Tour

Swedish Golf Tour (women)
Swedish Golf Tour (women)